Ümit is a unisex Turkish given name and occasional surname, meaning “hope”,  originated from the Persian name, Omid. Notable people with the name include:

Given name
 Ümit Aydın (born 1980), Turkish footballer
 Ümit Haluk Bayülken (1921–2007), Turkish diplomat and politician
 Ümit Davala (born 1973), Turkish football coach
 Ümit Kaftancıoğlu (1935–1980), Turkish TV producer
 Ümit Karan (born 1976), Turkish football player
 Ümit Korkmaz (born 1985), Austrian footballer of Turkish descent
 Ümit Kurt (born 1991), Turkish footballer
 Ümit Yaşar Oğuzcan (1926–1984), Turkish poet
 Ümit Özdağ (born 1961), Turkish politician 
 Ümit Sonkol (born 1982), Turkish basketball player
 Ümit Şamiloğlu (born 1980), Turkish artistic gymnast

Surname
Ahmet Ümit (born 1960), Turkish author and poet
Tarık Ümit (1947–1995), Turkish intelligence official

See also
 Umut, a Turkish given name

Turkish masculine given names
Turkish-language surnames